Mount Hancock may refer to:

 Hancock Mountain (Oklahoma)
 Hancock Mountain (Oregon)
 Hancock Mountain (Vermont)
 Hancock Peak (Colorado)
 Hancock Peak (New Hampshire)
 Hancock Peak (Alaska)
 Hancock Peak (Iron County, Utah)
 Hancock Peak (Garfield County, Utah)
 Mount Hancock (Montana)
 Mount Hancock (New Hampshire)
 Mount Hancock (Wyoming)

See also
 Hancock Hill (disambiguation), listing hills, knolls and buttes

tr:Hancock